Cerithiopsis virginica is a species of sea snail, a gastropod in the family Cerithiopsidae, which is known from the northwestern Atlantic Ocean. It was described by Henderson and Bartsch, in 1914.

References

virginica
Gastropods described in 1914